McDonald is an extinct town in Barry County, in the U.S. state of Missouri. The community once held the county seat of Barry County.

McDonald was laid out in 1841, and named in honor of a family of settlers. A post office called McDonald was established in 1840, and remained in operation until 1854.

References

Ghost towns in Missouri
Former populated places in Barry County, Missouri